René Tinner (born February 18, 1953, in St. Gallen) is a Swiss recording engineer and producer, who has produced over 200 studio records and numerous live performances.

Career 
Tinner began his career as the audio engineer of the German rock band Can in 1973, with whom he has recorded seven albums until 1989. In 1978 Tinner took over the so-called Can-Studio, which had been and continued to be the rehearsal and recording room of the Cologne based band Can. Tinner managed the studio until it was dismantled to be integrated into the German rock'n pop museum in 2007. 
During those years, Tinner produced there many artists and bands. In 1978 and 1979 Tinner worked on two records of Lou Reed (Live: Take No Prisoners and The Bells).  Other artists and bands he produced with in his studio were Maloo (worldwide hit single “The Captain of Her Heart”), KFC, Joachim Witt, Trio, Traffic, Holger Czukay, Die Krupps, Floyd George, Julian Dawson, Marius Müller-Westernhagen, Helen Schneider, Fury in the Slaughterhouse, Jule Neigel Band, Kreisler, amongst many other artists and bands of international recognition. Tinner produced there also Jim Capaldi's record Living On the Outside (2001).

On November 9, 2007, Can-Studio was integrated into the German rock'n pop museum in Gronau, where it was inaugurated in the presence of all the Can band members and René Tinner himself. Tinner went on to work with clients from various backgrounds in other studios, predominantly across Europe, such as German actor and musician Marius Müller-Westernhagen, multi-award winning Russian band Mumiy Troll, German comedian Dieter Nuhr, Norwegian alternative rock band Serena-Maneesh, and others.

Tinner has also completed numerous TV and film soundtracks. In 2008, Tinner recorded the film music of the Wim Wenders movie Palermo Shooting (presented at Cannes Film Festival in 2008). Other TV and film soundtrack productions include Messer im Kopf (Reinhard Hauff, 1978), Schneeland (Hans W. Geißendörfer, 2004),  (2012), and many more. Tinner is the producer of Minneapolis based independent production company Megabien Entertainment.

Discography 
 CAN: Soon over Babaluma, 1974
 CAN: Landed, 1975
 CAN: Flow Motion, 1976
 CAN: Saw Delight, 1977
 CAN: Out of reach, 1978
 CAN: Can, 1979
 Lou Reed: LIVE Take no prisoners, 1979
 Lou Reed: The Bells, 1979
 Joachim Witt: Silberblick, 1980
 Mitch Ryder: Got change for a million, 1980
 Duesenberg: Strangers, 1980
 Irmin Schmidt: Filmmusik Vol. 1, 1980
 Holger Czukay: On the way to the peak of normal, 1981
 Jaki Liebezeit & Phantom Band: Phantom Band, 1981
 Irmin Schmidt: Filmmusik Vol. 2, 1981
 Joachim Witt: Edelweiß, 1982
 Jaki Liebezeit & Phantom Band: Freedom of speech, 1983
 Trio: Bye Bye, 1983
 Joachim Witt: Märchenblau, 1983
 Holger Czukay: Der Osten ist rot, 1984
 Marius Müller-Westernhagen: Die Sonne so rot, 1984
 Zeltinger Band: Der Chef, 1984
 Joachim Witt: Mit Rucksack und Harpune, 1985
 Holger Czukay & Jah Wobble Full Circle, 1985
 Jaki Liebezeit & Phantom Band: Nowhere, 1985
 Double: Blue (Captain of her heart), 1985
 Marius Müller-Westernhagen: Lausige Zeiten, 1986
 Romie Singh: Masters, 1986
 Irmin Schmidt: Musk at Dusk, 1987
 Julian Dawson: As real as Disneyland, 1987
 Rams: Romantic Challenge, 1987
 Julian Dawson: Luckiest Man in the Western World, 1988
 Marius Müller-Westernhagen: Westernhagen, 1988
 Holger Czukay & David Sylvian: Plight & Premonition, 1988
 CAN: Rite Time, 1989
 Marius Müller-Westernhagen: Halleluja, 1989
 Haindling: Muh, 1989
 Holger Czukay & David Sylvian Flux & Mutability, 1989
 Marius Müller-Westernhagen: LIVE, 1990
 Jule Neigel Band: Wilde Welt, 1990
 Kreisler: So bizarre, 1990
 Irmin Schmidt: Impossible Holidays, 1991
 Hans Christian Müller: Zeit lassn, 1992
 Jingo de Lunch: Déja Voodoo, 1994
 Floyd George: Teenage Radio, 1994
 Hubert von Goisern & die Alpinkatzen: Omunduntn, 1994
 Michel van Dyke: Reincarnation, 1994
 Doran, Studer, Minton, Bates, Ali: Play the music of Jimi Hendrix, 1994
 Kurt Maloo: Soul & Echo, 1995
 Fury in the Slaughterhouse: Brilliant Thieves, 1997
 Pia Lund: Lundaland, 1999
 Eric D. Clark: Fur Dancefloor, 1999
 Element of Crime: Psycho Engineer 1999
 Marius Müller-Westernhagen: So weit, 2000
 Hans Nieswandt: Lazer Musik, 2000
 Pia Lund: La folie Angélique, 2001
 Element of Crime: Romantic, 2001
 Jim Capaldi: Living on the outside, 2001
 Justus Köhncke: Was ist Musik, 2002
 Jim Capaldi: Poor boy blue, 2003
 The New London Chorale: The young Mendelsohn, 2003
 Justus Köhncke: Doppelleben, 2004
 Andreas Dorau: Ich bin der eine von uns beiden, 2005
 Helen Schneider: Like a woman, 2007
 Marius Müller-Westernhagen: Wunschkonzert, 2008
 Serena Maneesh: No 2: Abyss in B Minor, 2009
 Safranski, Joeres, Schmeckenbecher: Schiller und die Romantik, 2009
 Irmin Schmidt: Filmmusik Anthology Vol. 4 & 5, 2009
 Zeltinger Band: Die Rückkehr des Retters, 2010
 Dieter Nuhr: Nuhr unter uns (Comedy), 2011
 Fortuna Ehrenfeld: Das Ende der Coolness Vol.2, 2015

Filmography  
 Eurogang (TV-series), engineer (4 episodes), 1975
 Messer im Kopf (film directed by Reinhard Hauff), engineer, 1978
 Flächenbrand (directed by Alexander v. Eschwege), engineer, 1981
 Die Heimsuchung des Assistenten Jung (film directed by Thomas Schamoni), engineer, 1981
 Rote Erde I & II (TV-series directed by Klaus Emmerich), engineer (14 episodes), 1983/86
 Westernhagen Live (video), music producer and mixing engineer, 1990 
 Lola da musica (TV-series), himself, 1997 
 CAN: Het zwarte gat (TV documentary), himself, 1997
 Tausendschönchen (TV-series (Bloch) directed by Christoph Stark), engineer, 2003
 Silbergraue Augen (TV-series (Bloch) directed by Markus O. Rosenmüller), engineer, 2003
 Ich werde immer bei Euch sein (TV-series directed by Markus Fischer), engineer, 2003
 Wenn Frauen Austern essen (TV film (Tatort) directed by Klaus Emmerich), engineer 2003
 Fleck auf der Haut (TV-series (Bloch) directed by ), engineer, 2004
 Schwestern (TV-series (Bloch) directed by Edward Berger), engineer, 2004
 Der Stich des Skorpion (TV film directed by ), engineer, 2004
 Schneeland (film directed by Hans W. Geißendörfer), engineer, 2004
 Ein krankes Herz (TV-series (Bloch) directed by Michael Hammon), engineer, 2005
 Palermo Shooting (movie directed by Wim Wenders), engineer, 2008 
 Da Da Da - Drei Mann im Doppelbett (TV movie documentary), himself, 2009  
 Spiegel TV - "Inside Nazi Germany" (documentary), engineer, 2011
  (film directed by ), engineer, 2012
  (TV film (Tatort) directed by ), engineer and mixing 2015

References

External links 
 record productions, which René Tinner worked on as a producer, on hitparade.ch
 credits of René Tinner on www.allmusic.com
 discography of René Tinner on www.discogs.com
 the history of CAN
 
 producer of Megabien Entertainment

Swiss record producers
1953 births
Living people
People from St. Gallen (city)